Xeractinol is a flavanonol, a type of flavonoid. It is a glucoside that can be found in the leaves of Paepalanthus argenteus (Eriocaulaceae).

References

External links

Flavanonol glucosides
C-glycoside natural phenols